Great Salt Pond is a 188 ha water body in the country of Sint Maarten on the island of Saint Martin in the Dutch Caribbean. It has been identified as an Important Bird Area by BirdLife International because it supports a large seasonal aggregation of laughing gulls. It borders the capital city of Philipsburg and is the largest pond on the island. It has a high salinity (27-38 parts per thousand) and suffers pollution from landfill and urban runoff.

References

Important Bird Areas of the Dutch Caribbean
 Natural history of Sint Maarten
Bodies of water of Sint Maarten